Justicidin A is a organic compound isolated from Justicia procumbens. It is classified as a lignan. The compound may possess cytotoxic effects.

References 

Lactones
Benzodioxoles
Phenol ethers
Lignans